Robert Anderson Brennan (14 March 1925 – 1 January 2002) was a professional footballer who made more than 400 appearances in the Football League, which included 225 matches for Norwich City, and was capped five times for Northern Ireland. He played as an inside left or winger.

Life and career
Born in Belfast, Brennan began his career in his home country of Northern Ireland, firstly with Harland and Wolff Welders and then Bloomfield United and Distillery. He moved to England in 1947 to join Luton Town. He subsequently moved to Birmingham City in 1949 and Fulham in 1950.

Brennan's first spell with Norwich City lasted from 1953 to 1956. He left the club to play for Great Yarmouth Town before returning to Norwich in 1957. In the 1958–59 season, Brennan was a member of the Norwich team that reached the semi-finals of the FA Cup as a Third Division side. It was one of the most famous FA Cup runs in the history of the competition, as the club beat First Division teams Manchester United and Tottenham Hotspur along the way. In the semi-final against his former club Luton, Brennan scored Norwich's equaliser in the first match at White Hart Lane before the team lost the replay at St Andrew's, Birmingham.

Brennan left Norwich for the second time in 1961 to join King's Lynn.

In 2002, Brennan was made an inaugural member of the Norwich City F.C. Hall of Fame.

He died in Norwich in 2002.

References
 For infobox stats:

Sources
Canary Citizens by Mark Davage, John Eastwood, Kevin Platt, published by Jarrold Publishing, (2001), 

1925 births
2002 deaths
Association footballers from Belfast
Association footballers from Northern Ireland
Association football wingers
Association football inside forwards
Pre-1950 IFA international footballers
Northern Ireland international footballers
Lisburn Distillery F.C. players
Luton Town F.C. players
Birmingham City F.C. players
Fulham F.C. players
Norwich City F.C. players
Great Yarmouth Town F.C. players
NIFL Premiership players
English Football League players
Southern Football League players
Expatriate footballers in England